František Břečka (born 21 June 1958) is a Czech former sprinter. He competed in the men's 200 metres at the 1980 Summer Olympics.

References

1958 births
Living people
Athletes (track and field) at the 1980 Summer Olympics
Czech male sprinters
Olympic athletes of Czechoslovakia
Place of birth missing (living people)